Best Seller is a 1987 American neo-noir crime thriller film written by Larry Cohen, directed by John Flynn and starring James Woods and Brian Dennehy. The film tells the story of Cleve (Woods), a career hitman, who wants to turn his life story into a book written by Dennis Meechum (Dennehy), a veteran police officer and best-selling author

The words and lyrics to the final score, entitled "Perfect Ending", were written by Lamont Dozier.

Plot
In 1972 a group of gunmen wearing Richard Nixon Halloween masks steal evidence from a police evidence storage unit, killing several officers in the process. Officer Dennis Meechum (Brian Dennehy) is seriously wounded after stabbing one of the robbers. He survives and publishes a book titled Inside Job based on his experience. In 1987, Meechum, who by now has become an acclaimed author and a much decorated detective, is working on his next novel. He now suffers from writer's block, and is a widowed father raising his daughter, Holly (Allison Balson).

On a case at the docks in Los Angeles, a suspect runs as Meechum gives chase. A man named Cleve (James Woods) joins the chase. The suspect hides in an overhead crane and attempts to shoot Meechum, but Cleve kills the man, then mysteriously disappears.
 
Cleve arranges a meeting with Meechum, and tries to convince him to write a book about his history as a paid assassin for a corporate empire, Kappa International. Cleve intimidates Kappa's founder, David Madlock (Paul Shenar) about Meechum's next book, and promises Meechum to show evidence to back up his claims. They proceed to take trips to New York City first and then to Texas, where Cleve tries to convince Meechum of his history of hits. While they are in a restaurant, Meechum finds out that Cleve was the injured masked gunman that he had stabbed years earlier. Madlock, through his legal representatives, tries to bribe Meechum but fails.

When an enforcer tries to steal a manuscript of Meechum's novel and attempts to kill Holly, Cleve intervenes by killing him. Cleve attempts to keep Holly safe by sending her to Meechum's agent, Roberta Gillian (Victoria Tennant). Madlock, however, manages to kidnap Holly. Meechum decides to have a meeting with Madlock at the latter's oceanfront estate. Cleve storms into the house, and guns down all of Madlock's bodyguards. Cleve then sacrifices his own life to save Holly from Madlock. Meechum arrests Madlock, before comforting a dying Cleve. Cleve reminds Meechum about the book and says "Remember I'm the hero". In the end, it is revealed that Meechum has published the book titled Retribution: The Fall of David Madlock and Kappa International and it has had 28 weeks on the bestseller list.

Cast
 James Woods as Cleve
 Brian Dennehy as Dennis Meechum
 Victoria Tennant as Roberta Gillian
 Allison Balson as Holly Meechum
 Paul Shenar as David Madlock
 George Coe as Graham
 Anne Pitoniak as Mrs. Foster
 Mary Carver as Cleve's Mother
 Sully Boyar as Monks
 Kathleen Lloyd as Annie
 Harold Tyner as Cleve's Father
 Jay Ingram as Turner
 Jeffrey Josephson as Pearlman
 Edward Blackoff as Thorn
 J.P. Bumstead as Rothman
 Daniel Trent as Jarvis
 William Bronder as Foley

Production
Larry Cohen wrote the original script. He was inspired by the film Strangers on a Train (1951) and wrote it with Burt Lancaster and Kirk Douglas in mind for the lead roles. The project was in development at a number of studios for years before Orion decided to make it.

John Flynn says he substantially rewrote the script which was originally called Hard Cover.

Cohen was happy with the casting of Dennehy and Woods. He later said, "The picture itself turned out to be pretty good with one glaring exception: the ending. Everything was going along great but then, in the last five minutes, they fucked up the whole movie. That is what I mean when I say it [the film] was only partially successful."

Cohen's problem was that the climax had Dennehy's daughter running towards the killer instead of away from him. He recommended the scene be re-cut without shooting extra footage but says he was ignored.

Reception
Cohen says the film " didn’t do that well" financially "even though— as I keep saying— it was a good picture all the way up to the climax. I don’t want to go on about it, but they killed the movie with that conclusion and it’s amazing how you can do that. If they had made that one little cut I suggested, maybe the word of mouth would have been a little better and Best Seller could have made some money."

Roger Ebert gave the film 1 star out of 4 stars, but Jonathan Rosenbaum called it "first-class action storytelling stripped to its essentials," with Dennehy making "a wonderful straight man for Woods's fascinatingly creepy yet sensitive killer."

References
Doyle, Michael, Larry Cohen: The Stuff of Gods and Monsters Bear Manor Media, 2015

External links

 
 
 
 

1987 films
1980s crime thriller films
American crime thriller films
Films about writers
Films directed by John Flynn
American neo-noir films
Orion Pictures films
Films with screenplays by Larry Cohen
1980s English-language films
1980s American films